The 1997 San Diego Padres season was the 29th season in franchise history. The Padres finished last in the National League West. Right fielder (and future Hall of Famer) Tony Gwynn had the highest batting average in the majors, at .372.

In April, the Padres played three home games at the Aloha Stadium in Hawaii against the St. Louis Cardinals. The Cardinals won the opening two games (a doubleheader) on April 19, winning the first 1-0 and the second 2-1 before the Padres won game 3 on Sunday April 20 by a score of 8-2. Reported attendances were 37,382 (games 1 and 2) and 40,050 (game 3).

Regular season

Transactions
 June 13, 1997: Fernando Valenzuela was traded by the San Diego Padres with Scott Livingstone and Phil Plantier to the St. Louis Cardinals for Rich Batchelor, Danny Jackson, and Mark Sweeney.
 August 13, 1997: Rickey Henderson was traded by the San Diego Padres to the Anaheim Angels for a player to be named later, Ryan Hancock, and Stevenson Agosto (minors). The Anaheim Angels sent George Arias (August 19, 1997) to the San Diego Padres to complete the trade.

Opening Day Starters

Season standings

Record vs. opponents

Roster

Player stats

Batting

Starters by position
Note: Pos = Position; G = Games played; AB = At bats; H = Hits; Avg. = Batting average; HR = Home runs; RBI = Runs batted in

Other batters
Note: G = Games played; AB = At bats; H = Hits; Avg. = Batting average; HR = Home runs; RBI = Runs batted in

Pitching

Starting pitchers
Note: G = Games pitched; IP = Innings pitched; W = Wins; L = Losses; ERA = Earned run average; SO = Strikeouts

Other pitchers 
Note: G = Games pitched; IP = Innings pitched; W = Wins; L = Losses; ERA = Earned run average; SO = Strikeouts

Relief pitchers 
Note: G = Games pitched; W = Wins; L = Losses; SV = Saves; ERA = Earned run average; SO = Strikeouts

League Honors

All-Stars
 Ken Caminiti, starting 3B
 Steve Finley
 Tony Gwynn, starting DH

Awards
 Gold Glove: Ken Caminiti (3B)
 Silver Slugger Award: Tony Gwynn (OF)

Statistical Leaders
 Tony Gwynn: Batting Champion (.372)

Farm system

References

External links
 1997 San Diego Padres at Baseball Reference
 1997 San Diego Padres at Baseball Almanac

San Diego Padres seasons
San Diego Padres Season, 1997
San Diego Padres
San Diego Padres